The Star Model 1914 was produced by Star Bonifacio Echeverria S.A., and largely an improved version of the Star Model 1908, particularly in terms of ergonomics.  This model was chosen by the French Army in 7.65mm Browning calibre, also called the Pistolet automatique Star.  Based on the Mannlicher 1901/1905, it was produced in 1919 in two versions which varied in dimensions and capacity.  It was carried by the French in both World Wars.  Its construction and reputation were better than that of the Ruby Llama.

Numerical data

Star 1914—"1st" or "Troop type"
 Calibre: 7.65mm Browning
 Length: 20 cm
 Barrel: 14 cm
 Weight (unloaded): 910 g
 Magazine: 9 rounds

Star 1914—"2nd" or "Officer type"
 Calibre: 7.65mm Browning
 Length: 19 cm
 Barrel: 12.5 cm
 Weight (unloaded): 880 g
 Magazine: 7 rounds

.32 ACP semi-automatic pistols
French World War I small arms
Semi-automatic pistols of Spain
Star semi-automatic pistols
World War II infantry weapons of France